Lenya can refer to:
Apache Lenya, a content management system from the Apache Software Foundation
Lenya, a town in Burma
Lenya, a crater on Mars named after the Burmese town
Lotte Lenya (1898–1981), Austrian-American singer and actress
Jackie Lenya (1941), a British actress